The CLASP (Consortium of Local Authorities Special Programme) system was a scheme developed in the 1950s by English local authorities to devise a method of designing and assembling prefabricated buildings for use in the public sector.  The former Southern Region of British Rail, the state-owned railway operator, adopted the system in the 1960s and 1970s and used it for signalboxes and station buildings.  The Western Region also rebuilt some stations using the same methods.

History
After the Second World War, many stations and signalboxes on the Southern Region's large and busy network required renewal or replacement, but funds were limited: several electrification schemes had to be paid for, new trains were required and other modernisation work was taking place.  By the 1960s, the need for immediate action became so great that the Region's management had to abandon traditional individual rebuilding projects in favour of a mass-produced solution using factory-made parts.

The CLASP method, used since the 1950s by local authorities for schools and other public buildings, was chosen.  The prefabricated buildings were made of steel and concrete, and had several distinctive characteristics: a steel-framed, flat-roofed "box", usually one storey high (although some two-storey versions were produced), with a large water tank mounted on the roof.  Windows were small and placed high on the building, immediately below the roof.  Evenly spaced wooden or metal pillars held up canopies which were usually wood-panelled underneath.  Pre-formed panels of aggregate-coated concrete formed the outer walls.

The first CLASP signalboxes were built in 1964; in 1965, the scope was widened to include stations.  The structures were cheaply built and quickly decayed; several were soon replaced by new buildings.  The Southern Region abandoned the scheme in 1973, although the Western Region adopted it at three locations between 1971 and 1977.

List of stations rebuilt using CLASP methods

SCOLA
The SCOLA (Second Consortium of Local Authorities) scheme, similar to CLASP, was also developed for use by schools.  Its buildings made use of brick and timber instead of concrete.  British Rail used it twice on the Southern Region, when Newington and Teynham stations were rebuilt in the late 1970s to suit one-man operation.

Post-1970s developments
From 1980 and throughout the next ten years and into the 1990s, British Rail adopted a new system of brick buildings with apex roofs, smaller examples resembling a 'chalet'. These include Headcorn, Staplehurst and Marden.

References

Notes

Bibliography

British Rail infrastructure
Architecture in England
Prefabricated buildings